Perezia magellanica is a species of flowering plants in the family Asteraceae. It is the type species of its genus. It is found in Argentina and Chile.

References 

 Christian Friedrich Lessing, Linnaea, 5, page 23, 1830

External links 
 
 
 Perezia magellanica at Tropicos

Nassauvieae
Plants described in 1811
Flora of Argentina
Flora of Chile